Dolophrosyne coniades is a moth of the family Notodontidae first described by Herbert Druce in 1893. It is found in cloud-forest habitats in Ecuador.

The larvae feed on Chusquea scandens.

References

Moths described in 1893
Notodontidae of South America